Faryab is one of the thirty-four provinces of Afghanistan, which is located in the north of the country bordering neighboring Turkmenistan. It has a population of about 1,109,223, which is multi-ethnic and mostly a tribal society. The province encompasses 15 districts and over 1,000 villages. The capital of Faryab province is Maymana. It also borders Jowzjan Province, Sar-e Pol Province, Ghor Province and Badghis Province.

History

Faryab is a Persian toponym meaning "lands irrigated by diversion of river water". The name Faryab takes its name from a town founded in the area by the Sassanids. It is the home town of the famed Islamic philosopher, al-Farabi (per the biographer Ibn al-Nadim). The area is part of the trans-border region of Greater Khorasan; during the colonial era, British geographers referred to the area as Afghan Turkestan.

The history of settlement in Faryab is ancient and comprises layer upon layer of occupation. At times, it was a melting pot within which a host of cultures have merged into a non-conflictual whole or at least peaceable coexistence.

Maymana and Andkhoy (Andkhui)  entered written history 2,500 years ago when Jews arrived and settled in 586 BC, fleeing the destruction of Jerusalem by Nebuchadnezzar. The territory was under Persian control at the time, which later gave way to Greek rule following the conquest by Alexander the Great in 326 BC.

Persian dominance was restored from the 3rd to the 7th century AD.

The pre-Islamic period ended with the conquest of northern Afghanistan by Arab Muslims (651-661 AD). The area "turned into a vast battlefield as the two great Arab and Persian cultures battled for not only political and geographical supremacy but ideological supremacy." As a result, centuries of Zoroastrianism, Buddhism, Nestorian Christianity and indigenous pagan cults were swept away. Various Islamic dynasties rose to power and influenced the locals. They included the Saffarids, Samanids, Ghaznavids, Seljuks, and Ghurids.

The history of Faryab was greatly altered yet again in the 11th century, this time with the invasion of the Mongols, under Genghis Khan and his descendants. As they moved into the area from the north, cities and towns including Maymana were razed, populations massacred, grain, fields and livestock stolen or burnt and ancient irrigation systems obliterated. Faryab was itself destroyed by the Mongols in 1220.   Control by the Mongols stemmed from the alternating capitals of Bukhara or Samarkand north of the Amu Darya River. They ruled in a decentralized manner, however, allowing local tribal chiefs in Maymana and elsewhere considerable autonomy (a legacy which was to last until the end of the 19th century).
 
In 1500, Uzbek princes, in the form of the Khanate of Bukhara (a Turco-Mongol state), swept across the Amu Darya, reaching Faryab and related areas around 1505. They joined a substantial and largely pastoral Arab population and ruled the area until the mid-18th century.

It was conquered by Ahmad Shah Durrani in 1748 and became part of the Durrani Empire. The area was untouched by the British during the three Anglo-Afghan wars that were fought in the 19th and 20th centuries. Faryab become a province in 1964. From the administrative reforms of the 1930s until then it was known as Maymana and was a sub-province of Balkh Province, which had its headquarters in Mazar-i-Sharif.

During the 1990s Afghan Civil War (early 90s and late 90s), the front line between Taliban and opposition forces often fell between Badghis and Faryab provinces in the mid-1990s. Ismail Khan also fled to Faryab to reconstitute his forces following the Taliban takeover of Herat Province, but was betrayed by Abdul Malik Pahlawan.

In May 1997, Abdul Malik Pahlawan raised the Taliban flag over the capital of Maymana, switching sides and initiating a renewed Taliban offensive from the west. Following a series of changing allegiances and falling out with Malik, the Taliban withdrew from the area, but in 1998 a contingent of 8,000 Taliban fighters pressed through Faryab, seizing Abdul Rashid Dostum's headquarters in Sheberghan, in neighboring Jowzjan province.

Faryab province has been one of the more peaceful areas in Afghanistan since the fall of the Taliban government in late 2001. Recent development projects in the province have focused on expanding the agricultural potential of the province, in particular the re-forestation of areas of the province that were denuded in the recent past.
It was reported in 2006 that Abdul Malik Pahlawan's Freedom Party of Afghanistan still maintained an armed militant wing, which was contributing to instability in province. The Afghan National Security Forces (ANFS) began expanding and slowly took over control. The Afghanistan-Turkmenistan border is maintained by the Afghan Border Police (ABP) while law and order for the rest of the province is provided by the NATO-trained Afghan National Police (ANP).
Between 2006 and late 2014, the province had a Provincial Reconstruction Team (PRT), which was led by Norway. The Norwegian PRT had its base at Maymana and had also been given the responsibility for the Ghormach District.

Afghanistan signed a deal with China National Petroleum Corporation (CNPC) for the development of oil blocks in the Amu Darya basin, a project expected to earn billions of dollars over two decades; the deal covers drilling and a refinery in the northern provinces of Sar-e Pol and Faryab, and is the first international oil production agreement entered into by the Afghan government for several decades. CNPC began Afghan oil production in October 2012, and in the same month a huge gas reserves were discovered in the Andkhoy District of Faryab province.

In July 2016, Human Rights Watch accused Abdul Rashid Dostum's National Islamic Movement of Afghanistan of killing, abusing and looting civilians in Faryab.

As of January 2022, clashes have been reported in the province between Taliban and resistance fighter, including in the provincial capital Maimana.

Transport infrastructure

As of May 2014 Maymana Airport was served by regular passenger service to Herat.

The province's road infrastructure was described in 2006 as "completely in shambles" without even a single paved road.

There exists a short international railway connection between Andkhoy and Aqina, which then connects to the Turkmen rail network at Atamyrat.

Economy

Agriculture and animal husbandry are the primary economic activities in the province however Faryab is renowned for its carpets, knitted as well as woven Kilims, which are traditionally a female-dominated handicraft. The province has a disputed amount of natural gas reserves but levels of exploitation are low.

There is a salt mine in Dowlat Abad district and some marble resources (said to owned by Abdul Rashid Dostum) and there are also pistachio forests which produce Pistacia vera which are renowned for their color and intense flavor.

Healthcare

The percentage of households with clean drinking water increased from 23% in 2005 to 24% in 2011. The percentage of births attended to by a skilled birth attendant increased from 2% in 2005 to 16% in 2011.

Education

The overall literacy rate (6+ years of age) was 18% in 2011.
The overall net enrolment rate (6–13 years of age) increased from 53% in 2005 to 55% in 2011.

Demographics

As of 2021, the population of Faryab is about 1,129,528, which is multi-ethnic and mostly a tribal society. The main ethnic groups living in the province are Uzbeks, followed by Pashtuns, Tajiks and others. 

Dari, Uzbeki and Pashto are the main languages spoken in and around the province. All the inhabitants follow Islam, with Sunnis making up the majority while Shiites (Shias) make up the minority. The Shias are mainly the ethnic Hazaras.

Districts

See also
Provinces of Afghanistan

References

External links

 Faryab Province - Overview slides (University of Montana)

 
Provinces of Afghanistan
Provinces of the Islamic Republic of Afghanistan